Kiwaia palaearctica is a moth in the family Gelechiidae. It was described by Povolný in 1968. It is found in Nepal.

References

Kiwaia
Moths described in 1968